Performance is a UK television anthology series produced by Simon Curtis for the BBC. Twenty-six episodes aired on the BBC between 5 October 1991 and 21 March 1998, almost all of which were productions of classic and contemporary plays, including Uncle Vanya by Anton Chekhov, A Doll's House and Hedda Gabler by Henrik Ibsen, Six Characters in Search of an Author by Luigi Pirandello, King Lear by William Shakespeare, and The Deep Blue Sea by Terence Rattigan.

Among its directors were Karel Reisz, Anthony Page, Richard Eyre, Simon Curtis, and Harold Pinter.

Its high-profile cast included Colin Firth, Kenneth Branagh, Elizabeth McGovern, Jeremy Irons, Judi Dench, Hugh Grant, Alec Guinness, Tom Wilkinson, Miranda Richardson, Ian Holm, Bill Nighy, John Gielgud, and Juliet Stevenson.

List of episodes
The main sources for compiling this list was the BFI Film and TV Database and the website of the BBC Genome Project.

Legend: Se = Season; Ep = Episode

References

External links

1991 British television series debuts
1998 British television series endings
1990s British drama television series
BBC television dramas
1990s British anthology television series
English-language television shows